Melanoxena is a genus of moths in the family Choreutidae, containing only one species, Melanoxena falsissima, which is known from Colombia.

References

Choreutidae